Squib is an unincorporated community and former coal town in Pulaski County, Kentucky, United States. Their post office closed in 1975.

References

Unincorporated communities in Pulaski County, Kentucky
Unincorporated communities in Kentucky